Perla Tabares Hantman is the Chair of District 4 on the School Board of Miami-Dade County.

Hantman was first elected to the School Board in November 1996. Hantman attended the University of Havana, before emigrating from Cuba, and continuing her education at Barry University.

Hantman was the first Hispanic woman to serve as the Chair.

In April 2012, the Board approved three items proposed by Hantman. She was re-elected for the seventh time in 2013, previously serving in 1999, 2000, 2001, 2010, 2011, and 2012. Her 2010 campaign was met with minor controversy as Ralph Arza was noted being at her headquarters. Arza had previously resigned from the Florida House, in 2006, for sending out expletive-filled threats to another state representative.

In 2014, she ran for re-election, and drew a challenger, Duysevi "Sevi" Miyar. The Miami Herald recommended its readers to vote for Hantman for the Miami-Dade School Board. Hantman won the race against Miyar.

References

1940s births
Barry University alumni
Cuban women
Living people
Miami-Dade County Public Schools
People from Havana
School board members in Florida
University of Havana alumni